Jay Johnson (born September 18, 1969) is an American football coach and former player who is currently the offensive coordinator and quarterbacks coach for the Michigan State Spartans football team.

Coaching career

Colorado
On December 15, 2018, Johnson was hired as offensive coordinator and quarterbacks coach for Colorado.

Michigan State
On February 20, 2020, Johnson was hired as offensive coordinator and quarterbacks coach for Michigan State.

References

External links
 Michigan State profile

1969 births
Living people
American football quarterbacks
Central Michigan Chippewas football coaches
Colorado Buffaloes football coaches
Georgia Bulldogs football coaches
Kansas Jayhawks football coaches
Louisville Cardinals football coaches
Michigan State Spartans football coaches
Minnesota Golden Gophers football coaches
Missouri Tigers football coaches
Northern Iowa Panthers football players
Southern Miss Golden Eagles football coaches
Truman Bulldogs football coaches
High school football coaches in Missouri
People from Austin, Minnesota
People from Lakeville, Minnesota
Coaches of American football from Minnesota
Players of American football from Minnesota